USR Youth (Romanian: USR Tineret) is the youth organisation of the Save Romania Union (USR). It was created under Article 89 of the party statute.

Leadership
From 2018 to 2020, the organisation had a decentralised structure and lacked a traditional hierarchical style of leadership, owing to its rather informal nature. A definitive statute was adopted in 2020, and an Executive Board was elected in May 2020.

Alongside the president, directly elected by the organisation's members, there are six vice presidents assigned to the following portfolios: international relations, public policy, communication, human resources, civil society, and a final one tasked with managing the relationship with the rest of the party.

Stance on cannabis
USR Tineret is the first youth organisation of a Romanian political party to openly support the decriminalisation of cannabis. The organisation was openly critical of a bill project by USR MP Lavinia Cosma, meant to impose harsher punishments for cannabis trafficking.

Controversies
In November 2019, the organisation's Facebook page posted a viral meme comparing King Michael of Romania to manele singer Florin Salam in a tongue-in-cheek manner, in the context of Timișoara mayor Nicolae Robu banning the manele genre in the city's public areas. The meme was harshly criticised by Romanian conservatives and monarchists affiliated with the National Liberal Party (PNL).

See also
 Official website

References

Youth wings of political parties in Romania
Youth wings of liberal parties
Cannabis in Romania